Mauricio Mata Lara (12 April 1939 – 15 October 2020) was a Mexican cyclist. He competed in three events at the 1960 Summer Olympics.

References

External links
 

1939 births
2020 deaths
Mexican male cyclists
Olympic cyclists of Mexico
Cyclists at the 1960 Summer Olympics
Sportspeople from San Luis Potosí
Pan American Games medalists in cycling
Pan American Games bronze medalists for Mexico
Cyclists at the 1963 Pan American Games
20th-century Mexican people
21st-century Mexican people